Kingdom of the Vision (Arabic: مملكة الرؤية) is an economics book by Abdullah Al-Salloum. The book, subtitled "Within the Conflicts of Sustainability and Rent" (Arabic: بين مصارع الريعية والاستدامة), extensively elaborates on Saudi Arabia's Vision 2030; linking its strategy to macroeconomics theories. The title was ranked as best-seller on Jamalon – the Middle-East's largest online book retailer –, Jarir Reader – Middle-East's largest e-book store –, and Amazon's Arabic books category.

References

External links 
 Title website

Economics books
2018 non-fiction books
21st-century Arabic books